Luton Borough Council (also known as LBC, or Luton Council) is the local authority of Luton, England. It is a unitary authority, having the powers of a non-metropolitan county and district council combined. It is a member of the East of England Local Government Association.

It is made up of councillors from the 19 wards that the town is divided into. The current leader of the council, Hazel Simmons, is in the Labour Party.

Formation
On 1 April 1974, under the Local Government Act 1972, the pre-existing county borough was reconstituted as a non-metropolitan district with the same boundaries as the county borough, on 1 April 1997 Luton became a unitary authority area.

Council and cabinet

Wards
The borough is divided into 19 wards:

NHS 
In July 2017 it decided to merge its health commissioning budget with the local Clinical Commissioning Group, establishing an integrated commissioning committee. It is one of the first areas which the NHS has designated an Accountable care system.

Arms

See also 
 Luton Borough Council elections
 Politics in Luton

References

External links 
 

Unitary authority councils of England
Local education authorities in England
Local authorities in Bedfordshire
Leader and cabinet executives
Billing authorities in England
Borough Council